Oscar Verner Peterson (August 27, 1899 – May 13, 1942) was a Chief Petty Officer in the United States Navy who received the Medal of Honor posthumously in World War II for his actions during the Battle of the Coral Sea.

Early life and career
Peterson was born in Prentice, Wisconsin, and enlisted in the Navy on December 8, 1920. After his initial training, he spent his entire Navy career of over twenty years on sea duty aboard various ships. He and his wife Lola had two sons, Fred and Donald.

By the United States' entry into World War II, Peterson had achieved the rank of chief watertender.

Battle of the Coral Sea
On May 7, 1942, during the Battle of the Coral Sea, the Neosho was heavily damaged by Japanese dive bombers. In one bombing raid, Peterson and members of the repair party he led were severely wounded. Despite his injuries, he managed to close four bulkhead steam line valves, but suffered third-degree burns to his face, shoulders, arms and hands in the process. By shutting the valves, Peterson isolated the steam to the engine room and helped keep the ship operational.

The Neosho was eventually scuttled on May 11 by gunfire from the destroyer USS Henley. The Henley had taken aboard 123 survivors from the Neosho. Peterson died of his burn injuries on May 13 and was buried at sea, several hundred miles off the coast of Australia.

For his actions during the battle, Peterson was posthumously awarded the Medal of Honor later that year, on December 7. For unknown reasons, his family did not receive his medal in a formal presentation ceremony as was typical. Instead, the medal and accompanying certificate were mailed to his widow.

Peterson's official Medal of Honor citation reads:
For extraordinary courage and conspicuous heroism above and beyond the call of duty while in charge of a repair party during an attack on the U.S.S. Neosho by enemy Japanese aerial forces on 7 May 1942. Lacking assistance because of injuries to the other members of his repair party and severely wounded himself, Peterson, with no concern for his own life, closed the bulkhead stop valves and in so doing received additional burns which resulted in his death. His spirit of self-sacrifice and loyalty, characteristic of a fine seaman, was in keeping with the highest traditions of the U.S. Naval Service. He gallantly gave his life in the service of his country.

Awards
Medal of Honor
Purple Heart
Good Conduct Medal
American Defense Service Medal with "FLEET" clasp
Asiatic-Pacific Campaign Medal with two battle stars
World War II Victory Medal

Legacy
After Peterson's death, his widow and children moved from California to Richfield, Idaho. His wife Lola died in 1991, and his son Donald in 2008. On April 3, 2010, sixty-eight years after the Battle of the Coral Sea, a Medal of Honor presentation ceremony was held to amend for the one Peterson's wife never received. Rear Admiral James A. Symonds presented the medal and a forty-eight star U.S. flag to Peterson's surviving son, Fred. The ceremony, held at the Richfield meetinghouse of the Church of Jesus Christ of Latter-day Saints, was attended by roughly 850 people, including family members, veterans, and officials from the military and Idaho state government. A military-issued memorial marker for Peterson was placed in Richfield Cemetery the same day.

The U.S. Navy destroyer escort  was named in his honor.

References

External links

 Posthumous Medal of Honor given to S. Idaho family
 Idaho town to hold ceremony at Mormon church to honor WWII hero
 Medal of Honor Ceremony for Oscar Peterson
 

1899 births
1942 deaths
Military personnel from Wisconsin
United States Navy personnel killed in World War II
Deaths by airstrike during World War II
Burials at sea
United States Navy Medal of Honor recipients
People from Prentice, Wisconsin
United States Navy sailors
World War II recipients of the Medal of Honor